Reed Smoot (January 10, 1862February 9, 1941) was an American politician, businessman, and apostle of the Church of Jesus Christ of Latter-day Saints (LDS Church). First elected by the Utah State Legislature to the U.S. Senate in 1902, he served as a Republican senator from 1903 to 1933. From his time in the Senate, Smoot is primarily remembered as the co-sponsor of the 1930 Smoot–Hawley Tariff Act, which increased almost 900 American import duties. Criticized at the time as having "intensified nationalism all over the world" by Thomas Lamont of J.P. Morgan & Co., Smoot–Hawley is widely regarded as one of the catalysts for the worsening Great Depression.

Smoot was a prominent leader of the LDS Church, chosen to serve as an apostle in the Quorum of the Twelve Apostles in 1900. His role in the LDS Church (together with rumors of a secret church policy continuing polygamy and a secret oath against the United States) led to a controversy of four years after he was elected to the Senate in 1903. A Senate committee investigated his eligibility to serve, known as the Reed Smoot hearings, and recommended against him, but the full Senate voted to seat him. Smoot continued to be reelected to successive terms until he lost his seat in the 1932 elections. Smoot returned to Utah in 1933. Retiring from politics and business, he devoted himself to the church. At the time of his death, he was third in the line of succession to lead the LDS Church.

Early life, family, and religious activity
Smoot was born in 1862 in Salt Lake City, Utah Territory. He was the son of Mormon pioneer from Kentucky and Iowa, Abraham O. Smoot, who served as mayor of the city from 1856 to 1862. His mother was Anne Kristina Morrison Smoot, also known as Anne Kirstine Mauritzen before her marriage. Anne Kristina Morrison Smoot was Smoot's father's fifth wife of six plural marriages and 27 children, three of whom Abraham O. Smoot adopted. The family moved to Provo, Utah, when his father was called by Brigham Young to head the stake there. Smoot attended the University of Utah and graduated from Brigham Young Academy (now Brigham Young University) in Provo in 1879. Following which, Smoot served as a Mormon missionary in England. After returning to Utah, Smoot married Alpha M. Eldredge of Salt Lake City on September 17, 1884. They had six children together. Thereafter, Smoot became a successful businessman in the Salt Lake City area. In 1895, he became increasingly involved in the hierarchy of the LDS Church, advancing in authority. On April 8, 1900, Smoot was ordained an LDS Church apostle and member of the church's Quorum of the Twelve Apostles.

United States Senate
After becoming an apostle in 1900, Smoot received the approval of LDS Church president Joseph F. Smith to run for office in 1902. He had joined the Republican Party.

Smoot was elected by the Utah legislature to the United States Senate (58th Congress) on January 20, 1903, as a Republican Senator, representing the state. Smoot was introduced to the United States Senate by Utah's senior U.S. Senator, Republican Thomas Kearns, a Catholic who had been elected in 1901 over Smoot. Two years later Smoot ran again and was elected to the Senate.

Controversy over religious affiliation
Smoot's election sparked a bitter four-year battle in the Senate on whether Smoot was eligible and should be allowed to serve. Many Americans were suspicious of the LDS Church because of its earlier polygamous practices. In addition, some senators thought Smoot's position as a Mormon apostle would disqualify him from representing all his constituents. Many were convinced that his association with the church disqualified him from serving in the United States Senate. Only a few years earlier, another prominent Utah Mormon, B. H. Roberts, had been elected to the House of Representatives. He was denied his seat on the basis that he practiced plural marriage (polygamy), which was illegal in Utah as well as all other states of the Union.

The LDS Church had officially renounced future plural marriages in an 1890 Manifesto, before Utah was admitted as a state. However, the Salt Lake Tribune reported that church leaders continued to approve secretly of new, post-Manifesto plural marriages. Because of the controversy, the Senate began an investigation into Smoot's eligibility. The Smoot Hearings began on January 16, 1904. The hearings included exhaustive questioning into the continuation of plural marriage within the state of Utah and the LDS Church, and questions on church teachings, doctrines, and history. Although Smoot was not a polygamist, the charge by those opposed to his election to the Senate was that he could not swear to uphold the United States Constitution while serving in the highest echelons of an organization that sanctioned law breaking.

Some opponents claimed that temple-attending Latter-day Saints took an "oath of vengeance" against the United States for past grievances. As a leader of the LDS Church, Smoot was accused of taking this oath, which he denied. Although the majority of the investigative committee recommended that Smoot be removed from office, on February 20, 1907, the two-thirds majority required to expel Smoot failed and he was allowed to keep his seat.

Political career

Smoot was reelected in 1908 and continued to be reelected to successive terms until 1932, serving in the Senate until March 1933. A constitutional amendment mandated the popular election of U.S. Senators after 1913. He was defeated in the 1932 election.

In 1916, William Kent was the lead sponsor in the House of Representatives of legislation to establish the National Park Service. Smoot sponsored the similar Senate bill. The legislation passed the House of Representatives on July 1, 1916, passed the Senate on August 5, and was signed by U.S. President Woodrow Wilson on August 25, 1916. The agency was placed within the cabinet Department of Interior.

Smoot was Chairman of the Senate Finance Committee from 1923 to 1933, and served on the Senate Appropriations Committee. He became active in the national Republican Party and served as a delegate to the Republican national convention every four years between 1908 and 1924. He was Chairman of the 1928 Resolutions Committee at the 1928 Republican National Convention and Chairman of the Republican Senatorial Campaign Committee.

Smoot was a co-sponsor of the Smoot–Hawley Tariff Act in 1930, which raised U.S. import tariffs on over 20,000 dutiable items to record levels. Many historians believe that it exacerbated the Great Depression. U.S. President Herbert Hoover signed the act into law on June 17, 1930.

Smoot served five terms before being defeated in the 1932 election by Democrat Elbert D. Thomas. After his unsuccessful reelection campaign, Smoot moved back to Salt Lake City. He retired from active business and political pursuits to dedicate his remaining years as an apostle for the LDS Church. Smoot died on February 9, 1941, during a visit to St. Petersburg, Florida. He was buried in Provo.

See also
List of United States senators expelled or censured
Reed Smoot hearings
Smoot–Hawley Tariff Act
Reed O. Smoot House
Smoot–Rowlett family

References

Further reading
 Flake, Kathleen. The Politics of American Religious Identity: The Seating of Senator Reed Smoot, Mormon Apostle. The University of North Carolina Press, 2003. excerpt and text search
 Paulos, Michael Harold. The Mormon Church on Trial: Transcripts of the Reed Smoot Hearings. Signature Books, Salt Lake City, Utah, 2008.
 Heath, Harvard S. In the World: The Diaries of Reed Smoot. Signature Books, Salt Lake City, Utah, 1997.
 Merrill, Milton R. Reed Smoot: Apostle in Politics. Utah State University Press, 1990.
 Smith, Konden R. "The Reed Smoot Hearings and the Theology of Politics: Perceiving an 'American' Identity," Journal of Mormon History, 35 (Summer 2009), pp. 118–62.

Archival materials
Reed Smoot collections at the L. Tom Perry Special Collections, Harold B. Lee Library, Brigham Young University
Correspondence between Senator Reed Smoot and N. V. Jones

External links

Grampa Bill's G.A. Pages: Reed Smoot

United States Senate's Senate Historical Office
 Who Was the First Mormon Senator? 

|-

|-

|-

|-

|-

|-

|-

|-

1862 births
1941 deaths
American general authorities (LDS Church)
Apostles (LDS Church)
Brigham Young Academy alumni
Harold B. Lee Library-related 19th century articles
Latter Day Saints from Utah
Latter Day Saints from Washington, D.C.
Politicians from Salt Lake City
Republican Party United States senators from Utah
Smoot–Rowlett family
University of Utah alumni
Utah Republicans